The Coram Experimental Forest was established in 1933 within the Flathead National Forest in the state of Montana, about 45 kilometers east of Kalispell, near Coram, and just outside the borders of Glacier National Park.

The forest is an outdoor laboratory established for research into the management of one species, the western larch (Larix occidentalis). A few of its western larches are over 500 years old. The forest is networked with roads but is not inhabited.

Coram Experimental Forest was a United Nations Biosphere Reserve but was withdrawn from the program as of June 14, 2017.

References

External links
Coram Experimental Forest, U.S. Forest Service
United Nations Educational, Scientific and Cultural Organization

Former biosphere reserves of the United States
Forests of Montana
Protected areas of Flathead County, Montana
Flathead National Forest
Research forests